Elections to the Assam Legislative Assembly were held on 25 February 1957. 312 candidates contested for the 94 constituencies in the Assembly. There were 14 two-member constituencies and 80 single-member constituencies.

Results

|- style="background-color:#E9E9E9; text-align:center;"
! class="unsortable" |
! Political party !! Flag !! Seats  Contested !! Won !! Net change  in seats !! % of  Seats
! Votes !! Vote % !! Change in vote %
|- style="background: #90EE90;"
| 
| style="text-align:left;" |Indian National Congress
| 
| 101 || 71 ||  5 || 65.74 || 13,21,367 || 52.35 ||  8.87
|-
| 
| style="text-align:left;" |Praja Socialist Party
|
| 36 || 8 || New || 7.41 || 3,21,569 || 12.74 || New
|-
| 
| style="text-align:left;" |Communist Party of India
| 
| 22 || 4 ||  3 || 3.70 || 2,04,332 || 8.10 ||  5.26
|-
| 
|
| 153 || 25 ||  11 || 23.15 || 6,76,698 || 26.81 || N/A
|- class="unsortable" style="background-color:#E9E9E9"
! colspan = 3|
! style="text-align:center;" |Total seats !! 108 ( 3) !! style="text-align:center;" |Voters !! 55,53,926 !! style="text-align:center;" |Turnout !! colspan = 2|25,23,966 (45.44%)
|}

Elected members

See also

 1957 elections in India
 1952 Assam Legislative Assembly election

References

1957
1957
Assam